Klemetsen is a Norwegian surname. Notable people with the surname include:

 Håvard Klemetsen (born 1979), Norwegian Nordic combined skier
 Ole Klemetsen (born 1971), Norwegian boxer

Norwegian-language surnames